Monika Rajnohová (born 26 May 1993) is a Slovak handball player for HC DAC Dunajská Streda and the Slovak national team.

References

1993 births
Living people
Slovak female handball players
Sportspeople from Žilina